Seltso (lit. little village) is a town in Bryansk Oblast, Russia, located on the Desna River  northwest of Bryansk. Population:  17,600 (1970).

History
Seltso was granted urban-type settlement status in 1938 and that of a town in 1990.

Administrative and municipal status
Within the framework of administrative divisions, it is incorporated as Seltsovsky Urban Administrative Okrug—an administrative unit with the status equal to that of the districts. As a municipal division, Seltsovsky Urban Administrative Okrug is incorporated as Seltso Urban Okrug.

History
Founded in 1876 in connection with the construction of Rigo-Oryol railway (built-station Selco Gorodtsov). The first industrial plants in steel mills Seltso Kuchkina, Dreyscheva, Kitaeva. From 1886 to 1914 he worked in the Selto small metallurgical plant Guboninsky consisting of the foundry and the forge. At the beginning of the 20th century in the hamlet operated two windmills and a steam mill, 10 sawmills, soap factories. In 1905, the gendarmerie post was established for the prevention of disorder or crime in Seltso.

References

Notes

Sources

Cities and towns in Bryansk Oblast
Cities and towns built in the Soviet Union
Oryol Governorate
1938 establishments in the Soviet Union